Disintegrin and metalloproteinase domain-containing protein 33 is an enzyme that in humans is encoded by the ADAM33 gene.

Function 

This gene encodes a member of the ADAM (a disintegrin and metalloprotease domain) family. Members of this family are membrane-anchored proteins structurally related to snake venom disintegrins, and have been implicated in a variety of biological processes involving cell-cell and cell-matrix interactions, including fertilization, muscle development, and neurogenesis. This protein is a type I transmembrane protein implicated in asthma and bronchial hyperresponsiveness. Alternative splicing of this gene results in two transcript variants encoding different isoforms.

References

Further reading

External links 
 The MEROPS online database for peptidases and their inhibitors: M12.244